Brandon Choi is an American comic book writer best known as one of the co-creators of the series Gen¹³ which enjoyed high popularity in the middle and late 1990s. He also wrote several other titles for WildStorm.

Choi was born in Seoul, Korea, and came to the U.S. when he was two years old. Choi formed a boyhood friendship with future comic book collaborator Jim Lee, and began creating comics together when they were both in the sixth grade. Their 1986 comic Wild Boys landed Lee his first job at Marvel Comics.

Choi studied entertainment law after high school, but changed careers after graduation. While making plans to attend graduate school to study screenwriting, Lee contacted Choi with an offer to work at Homage Studios, which later became Wildstorm Productions.

Choi co-created the WildC.A.T.s series with Lee in 1992, which included the character Grifter who was later incorporated into the DC Comics universe.

Bibliography

Image
 Darker Image #1 (1993)
 Deathblow #0–15, 17–29 (1993–96)
 Gen12 #1–5 (1998)
 Gen¹³ vol. 1 #1–5 (1994)
 Gen¹³ vol. 2 #0–29 (1995–98)
The Kindred #1–4 (1994)
 Savage Dragon #13 (1994)
 Stormwatch #0–8 (1993–94)
 Wetworks vol. 1 #1–3 (1994)
 WildC.A.T.s vol. 1 #0–9, #37–50 (1992–94, 1997–98)

Image/Valiant
 Deathmate Black (1993)

Marvel
 Fantastic Four vol. 2 #1–12 (1996–97)

References

Sources

 
 

American comics artists
American comics writers
Living people
Year of birth missing (living people)
WildStorm
20th-century American male writers